Shajghor is a 2007 Bangladeshi film directed by Shah Alam Kiron. The film was based on the story written by Humayun Ahmed. It feature Manna, Moushumi, Nipun Akhter and Kazi Hayat in the lead roles. It won several National Film Awards including Best Supporting Actress.

Cast
 Manna - Asif
 Moushumi - Leena
 Nipun Akter
 Kazi Hayat
 Prathorna Fardin Dighi
 Jamilur Rahman Shakha

Soundtrack
The film soundtrack was composed by Imon Saha and lyrics penned by Shah Alam Sarker and Munshi Wadud.

Awards

See also
 Daruchini Dwip

References

External links
 Shajghor at the Bangla Movie Database
 Shajghor at the Rotten Tomatoes

2007 films
2007 drama films
Films scored by Emon Saha
Bengali-language Bangladeshi films
2000s Bengali-language films
Bangladeshi drama films
Impress Telefilm films